Papualimosina is a genus of flies belonging to the family Lesser Dung flies.

Species
P. longidiscoidalis (Duda, 1925)

References

 

Sphaeroceridae
Diptera of Australasia
Brachycera genera